Sita also called as Janaki and Vaidehi is a Hindu goddess and the female protagonist of the Hindu epic, Ramayana. She is the consort of Rama, the avatar of the god Vishnu, and is regarded as a form of Vishnu's consort, Lakshmi. She is also the chief goddess of Rama-centric Hindu traditions. Sita is known for her dedication, self-sacrifice, courage, and purity. She is one of the seventeen national heroes (rastriya bibhuti) of Nepal.

Described as the daughter of Bhūmi (the earth), Sita is brought up as the adopted daughter of King Janaka of Videha. Sita, in her youth, chooses Rama, the prince of Ayodhya as her husband in a swayamvara. After the swayamvara,  she accompanies her husband to his kingdom, but later chooses to accompany her husband, along with her brother-in-law Lakshmana, in his exile. While in exile, the trio settles in the Dandaka forest from where she is abducted by Ravana, the Rakshasa king of Lanka. She is imprisoned in the garden of Ashoka Vatika, in Lanka, until she is rescued by Rama, who slays her captor. After the war, in some versions of the epic, Rama asks Sita to undergo Agni Pariksha (an ordeal of fire), by which she proves her purity, before she is accepted by Rama, which for the first time makes his brother Lakshmana get angry at him.

In some versions of the epic, Maya Sita, an illusion created by Agni, takes Sita's place and is abducted by Ravana and suffers his captivity, while the real Sita hides in the fire. Some scriptures also mention her previous birth being Vedavati, a woman Ravana tries to molest. After proving her purity, Rama and Sita return to Ayodhya, where they are crowned as king and queen. One day, a man questions Sita's purity and in order to prove her innocence and maintain his own and the kingdom's dignity, Rama sends Sita into the forest near the sage Valmiki's ashram. Years later, Sita returns to the womb of her mother, the Earth, for release from a cruel world and as a testimony of her purity, after she reunites her two sons Kusha and Lava with their father Rama.

Etymology and other names
The goddess is best known by the name "Sita", derived from the Sanskrit word sīta, furrow.

According to Ramayana, Janaka found her while ploughing as a part of a yagna and adopted her. The word Sīta was a poetic term, which signified fertility and the many blessings coming from settled agriculture. The Sita of the Ramayana may have been named after a more ancient Vedic goddess Sita, who is mentioned once in the Rigveda as an earth goddess who blesses the land with good crops. In the Vedic period, she was one of the goddesses associated with fertility. Rigveda 4.53.6, addressed to Agricultural Divinities, states

{{cquote|"Become inclined our way, well-portioned Furrow. We will extol you, so that you will be well-portioned for us, so that you will be well-fruited for us." 
-Translated by Jamison and Brereton
}}

In Harivamsa, Sita is invoked as one of the names of the goddess Arya:

The Kausik-sutra and the Paraskara-sutra associate her repeatedly as the wife of Parjanya (a god associated with rains) and Indra.

Sita is known by many epithets. She is called Jānaki as the daughter of Janaka and Maithili as the princess of Mithila. As the wife of Rama, she is called Ramā. Her father Janaka had earned the sobriquet Videha due to his ability to transcend body consciousness; Sita is therefore also known as Vaidehi.

Legend

Birth
In Valmiki's Ramayana, Sita is said to have been discovered in a furrow in a ploughed field, believed to be Sitamarhi in Mithila region of present-day Bihar, and for that reason is regarded as a daughter of Bhūmi Devi (the goddess earth). She was discovered, adopted and brought up by Janaka, king of Mithila and his wife Sunaina. This story is adapted into Kamban's Ramavataram, a Tamil version of the Ramayana.

The birthplace of Sita is disputed. The Sita Kund pilgrimage site which is located in present-day Sitamarhi district, Bihar, India is viewed as the birthplace of Sita. Apart from Sitamarhi, Janakpur, which is located in the present-day Province No. 2, Nepal, is also described as Sita's birthplace.
Other versions
 Janaka's biological daughter: In Ramopkhyana of the Mahabharata and also in Paumachariya of Vimala Suri, Sita has been depicted as Janaka's  biological daughter. According to Rev. Fr. Camille Bulcke, this motif that Sita was the biological daughter of Janaka, as described in Ramopkhyana Mahabharata was based on the authentic version of Valmiki Ramayana. Later, the story of Sita miraculously appearing in a furrow was inserted in Valmiki Ramayana.
 Ramayana Manjari: In Ramayana Manjari (verses 344–366), North-western and Bengal recensions of Valmiki Ramayana, it has been described as on hearing a voice from the sky and then seeing Menaka, Janaka expresses his wish to obtain a child, and when he finds the child, he hears the same voice again telling him the infant is his Spiritual child, born of Menaka.
 Reincarnation of Vedavati: Some versions of the Ramayana suggest that Sita was a reincarnation of Vedavati. Ravana tried to molest Vedavati and her chastity was sullied beyond Ravana's redemption when she was performing penance to become the consort of Vishnu. Vedavati immolated herself on a pyre to escape Ravana's lust, vowing to return in another age and be the cause of Ravana's destruction. She was duly reborn as Sita.
 Reincarnation of Manivati: According to Gunabhadra's Uttara Purana of the ninth century CE, Ravana disturbs the asceticism of Manivati, daughter of Amitavega of Alkapuri, and she pledges to take revenge on Ravana. Manivati is later reborn as the daughter of Ravana and Mandodari. But astrologers predicted the ruin of Ravana because of this child. So, Ravana gives orders to kill the child. Manivati is placed in a casket and buried in the ground of Mithila, where she is discovered by some of the farmers of the kingdom. Then Janaka, king of that state, adopts her.
 Ravana's daughter: In Sanghadasa's Jaina version of Ramayana, and also in Adbhuta Ramayana, Sita, entitled Vasudevahindi, is born as the daughter of Ravana. According to this version, astrologers predict that the first child of Vidyadhara Maya (Ravana's wife) will destroy his lineage. Thus, Ravana abandons her and orders the infant to be buried in a distant land where she is later discovered and adopted by Janaka.

Marriage

When Sita reaches adulthood, Janaka organizes a Swayamvara in Janakpurdham with the condition that Sita would marry only that person who would be able to string Pinaka, the bow of the god Shiva. Janaka knew that the bow of Shiva was not even liftable, let alone stringable for ordinary mortals, and for selfish people it was not even approachable. Devi Sita while playing with her sisters in childhood had unknowingly lifted the table over which the bow had been placed; this was something that no one in Mithila could do. This incident was however observed by Janaka and he decided to make it a backdrop for Swayamvara because he wanted a son-in-law who was as strong as his daughter.

At this time, Vishvamitra had brought Rama and his brother Lakshmana to the forest for the protection of sacrifice. Hearing about this swayamvara, Vishvamitra asks Rama to participate in it and takes Rama and Lakshmana to the palace of Janaka in Janakpur. Janaka is greatly pleased to learn that Rama and Lakshmana are sons of Dasharatha. Next morning, in the middle of the hall, Rama lifts up the bow of Shiva with his left hand, fastens the string taut and breaks the bow in the process. However, another avatar of Vishnu, Parashurama, became really angry as the bow of Shiva was broken. However, he does not realize that Rama is also an avatar of Vishnu, therefore after being informed of this, he apologizes for getting angry. Thus, Rama fulfills Janaka's condition to marry Sita. Later on Vivaha Panchami, a marriage ceremony is conducted under the guidance of Satananda. Rama marries Sita, Bharata marries Mandavi, Lakshmana marries Urmila and Shatrughna marries Shrutakirti.

Exile and abduction

Some time after the wedding, Kaikeyi, Rama's stepmother, compelled Dasharatha to make Bharata king, prompted by the coaxing of her maid Manthara, and forced Rama to leave Ayodhya and spend a period of exile in the forests of Dandaka and later Panchavati. Sita and Lakshmana willingly renounced the comforts of the palace and joined Rama in exile. The Panchavati forest became the scene for Sita's abduction by Ravana, King of Lanka. The scene started with Shurpanakha's love for Rama. However Rama refused her, stating that he was devoted to Sita. This enraged the demoness and she tried to kill Sita. Lakshmana cut Shurpanakha's nose and sent her back. Ravana, to kidnap Sita, made a plan. Maricha, his uncle, disguised himself as a magnificent deer to lure Sita. Sita, attracted to its golden glow asked her husband to make it her pet. When Rama and Lakshmana went far away from the hut, Ravana kidnapped Sita, disguising himself as a mendicant. Some versions of the Ramayana describe Sita taking refuge with the fire-god Agni, while Maya Sita, her illusionary double, is kidnapped by the demon-king. Jatayu, the vulture-king, tried to protect Sita but Ravana chopped off his wings. Jatayu survived long enough to inform Rama of what had happened.

Ravana took Sita back to his kingdom in Lanka and she was held as a prisoner in one of his palaces. During her captivity for a year in Lanka, Ravana expressed his desire for her; however, Sita refused his advances and struggled to maintain her chastity. Hanuman was sent by Rama to seek Sita and eventually succeeded in discovering Sita's whereabouts. Sita gave Hanuman her jewellery and asked him to give it to her husband. Hanuman returned across the sea to Rama.

Sita was finally rescued by Rama, who waged a war to defeat Ravana. Upon rescue, Rama makes Sita undergo a trial by fire to prove her chastity. In some versions of the Ramayana, during this test the fire-god Agni appears in front of Rama and attests to Sita's purity, or hands over to him the real Sita and declares it was Maya Sita who was abducted by Ravana. The Thai version of the Ramayana, however, tells of Sita walking on the fire, of her own accord, to feel clean, as opposed to jumping in it. She is not burnt, and the coals turn to lotuses.

Second exile

In the Uttara Kanda, following their return to Ayodhya, Rama was crowned as the king with Sita by his side. While Rama's trust and affection for Sita never wavered, it soon became evident that some people in Ayodhya could not accept Sita's long captivity under Ravana. During Rama's period of rule, an intemperate washerman, while berating his wayward wife, declared that he was "no pusillanimous Rama who would take his wife back after she had lived in the house of another man". The common folk started gossiping about Sita and questioned Ram's decision to make her queen. Rama was extremely distraught on hearing the news, but finally told Lakshmana that as a king, he had to make his citizens pleased and the purity of the queen of Ayodhya has to be above any gossip and rumour. With a heavy heart, he instructed him to take Sita to a forest outside Ayodhya and leave her there.

Thus Sita was forced into exile a second time. Sita, who was pregnant, was given refuge in the hermitage of Valmiki, where she delivered twin sons named Kusha and Lava. In the hermitage, Sita raised her sons alone, as a single mother. They grew up to be valiant and intelligent and were eventually united with their father. Once she had witnessed the acceptance of her children by Rama, Sita sought final refuge in the arms of her mother Bhūmi. Hearing her plea for release from an unjust world and from a life that had rarely been happy, the Earth dramatically split open; Bhūmi appeared and took Sita away.

According to the Padma-puran, Sita's exile during her pregnancy was because of a curse during her childhood. Sita had caught a pair of divine parrots, which were from Valmiki's ashram, when she was young. The birds were talking about a story of Sri Ram heard in Valmiki's ashram, which intrigued Sita. She has the ability to talk with animals. The female bird was pregnant at that time. She requested Sita to let them go, but Sita only allowed her male companion to fly away, and the female parrot died because of the separation from her companion. As a result, the male bird cursed Sita that she would suffer a similar fate of being separated from her husband during pregnancy. The male bird was reborn as the washerman.

Speeches in the Ramayana
While the Ramayana mostly concentrates on Rama's actions, Sita also speaks many times during the exile. The first time is in the town of Chitrakuta where she narrates an ancient story to Rama, whereby Rama promises to Sita that he will never kill anybody without provocation.

The second time Sita is shown talking prominently is when she speaks to Ravana. Ravana has come to her in the form of a mendicant and Sita tells him that he does not look like one.

Some of her most prominent speeches are with Hanuman when he reaches Lanka. Hanuman wants an immediate union of Rama and Sita and thus he proposes to Sita to ride on his back. Sita refuses as she does not want to run away like a thief; instead she wants her husband Rama to come and defeat Ravana to save her.

Jain version

Sita is the daughter of King Janak and Queen Videha of Mithalapuri. She has a brother named Bhamandal who is kidnapped soon after his birth by a deity due to animosity in a previous life. He is thrown into a garden of Rathnupur where he is dropped into the arms of King Chandravardhan of Rathnupur. The king and queen bring him up as their own son. Ram and Sita get married due to Bhamandal and in the course of events Bhamandal realises that Sita is his sister. It is then that he meets his birth parents.

Symbolism

A female deity of agricultural fertility by the name Sita was known before Valmiki's Ramayana, but was overshadowed by better-known goddesses associated with fertility. According to Ramayana, Sita was discovered in a furrow when Janaka was ploughing. Since Janaka was a king, it is likely that ploughing was part of a royal ritual to ensure fertility of the land. Sita is considered to be a child of Mother Earth, produced by union between the king and the land. Sita is a personification of Earth's fertility, abundance, and well-being.

Portrayal

Hindu tradition reveres Sita. She has been portrayed as an ideal daughter, an ideal wife and an ideal mother in various texts, stories, illustrations, movies, and modern media. Sita is often worshipped with Rama as his consort.  The occasion of her marriage to Rama is celebrated as Vivaha Panchami.

The actions, reactions, and instincts manifested by Sita at every juncture in a long and arduous life are deemed exemplary. Her story has been portrayed in the book Sitayanam. The values that she enshrined and adhered to at every point in the course of a demanding life are the values of womanly virtue held sacred by countless generations of Indians.

Temples
Although Sita's statue is always kept with Rama's statue in Rama temples, there are some temples dedicated to Sita:
 Janaki Mandir, located at Janakpur, Nepal
 Sita Mai Temple, situated in Sitamai village in the Karnal district of Haryana, India
 Sita Kund, Punaura Dham, situated in Sitamarhi District in Bihar, India
 Seetha Devi Temple, Pulpally in the Wayanad district, Kerala, India
 Seetha Amman Temple, Nähe Nuwara Eliya, Sri Lanka
 Sita temple,  Phalswari, Pauri district, Uttarakhand (Proposed)

Outside Indian subcontinent
Indonesia

In the Indonesian version, especially in Javanese wayang stories. Sita in Indonesia is called Rakyan Wara Sinta or Shinta''. Uniquely, she is also referred to as Ravana's own biological daughter, the Javanese version of Ravana is told that he fell in love with a female priest named Widawati. However, Widawati rejected his love and chose to commit suicide. Ravana was determined to find and marry the reincarnation of Widawati.

On the instructions of his teacher, Resi Maruta, Rahwana learns that Widawati will incarnate as his own daughter. But when his wife named Dewi Kanung gave birth, Ravana went to expand the colony. Wibisana took the baby girl who was born by Kanung to be dumped in the river in a crate. Wibisana then exchanged the baby with a baby boy she had created from the sky. The baby boy was finally recognized by Ravana as his son, and later became known as Indrajit.

Meanwhile, the baby girl who was dumped by Wibisana was carried by the river to the territory of the Mantili Kingdom. The king of the country named Janaka took and made her an adopted daughter, with the name Shinta.

The next story is not much different from the original version, namely the marriage of Shinta to Sri Rama, her kidnapping, and the death of Ravana in the great war. However, the Javanese version says, after the war ended, Rama did not become king in Ayodhya, but instead built a new kingdom called Pancawati. From her marriage to Rama, Sinta gave birth to two sons named Ramabatlawa and Ramakusiya. The first son, namely Ramabatlawa, brought down the kings of the Mandura Kingdom, including Basudeva, and also his son, Krishna.

The Javanese version of Krishna is referred to as the reincarnation of Rama, while his younger brother, Subhadra, is referred to as the reincarnation of Shinta. Thus, the relationship between Rama and Shinta, who in the previous life was husband and wife, turned into brother and sister in the next life.

Wayang story

Shinta is the daughter of an angel named Batari Tari or Kanun, the wife of Ravana. Shinta is believed to be the incarnation of Btari Widawati, the wife of Lord Vishnu. In the seventh month, Kanun who was "mitoni" her pregnancy, suddenly caused a stir in the Alengka palace, because the baby he was carrying was predicted by several priests who were at the party that he would become Rahwana's "wife" (his own father). Ravana was furious. He rose from his throne and wanted to behead Kanun. But before it was realized, Ravana suddenly canceled his intention because he thought who knew his child would become a beautiful child. Thus, she too will be willing to marry him. Sure enough, when Ravana was on an overseas service, his empress gave birth to a baby girl with a very beautiful face glowing like the full moon. Wibisana (Ravana's sister) who is holy and full of humanity, immediately took the baby and put it in Sinta's diamond, then anchored it into the river. Only God can help him, that's what Wibisana thought. He immediately made the black mega cloud into a baby boy who would later be named Megananda or Indrajit.

Syahdan a hermit named Prabu Janaka from the land of Mantili, begged the gods to be blessed with offspring. So surprised when he opened his eyes, he heard the cry of a baby in a sinking ketupat floating in the river. The baby was taken with pleasure and brought home adopted as his son. Because the baby is known to be in the diamond Sinta, then he was given the name Sinta. After being 17 years old, Sinta made a commotion all the youth, both domestic and foreign cadets because of her beauty.

One day, a contest was held. Anyone who can draw the giant bow of Mantili's national heritage will become Sinta's mate.
Ramawijaya, who was studying at the Brahmin Yogiswara, was advised to take part in the contest. Of course, Rama was successful, because he was the incarnation of Vishnu. Engagements and marriages are all enlivened with debauchery, both in the country of Mantili and in Ayodya. But luck was not good for both of them, while enjoying their honeymoon, suddenly the crown belonged to Kekayi, Rama's stepmother.

Dasarata Mr. Rama was ordered to hand over the crown to Bharata (Rama's younger brother). In addition, Rama, Sinta and Laksmana had to leave the palace into the wilderness for 13 years.

In exile in the jungle, Sinta is unable to contain her desire to control the tempting Kijang Kencana, which someone who is concerned should not have. What was sparkling, at first he thought would make him happy, but on the contrary. Not only can Kijang Kencana be caught, but moreover he is captured and held captive by his own lust, which is manifested in the form of Ravana. Briefly he was diruda paripaksa, put in a gold cage in Alengka for about 12 years.

One time, Raden Ramawijaya was defeated by Raden Ramawijaya, until Dewi Shinta was freed from Ravana's shackles. However, Shinta's suffering did not end there. After being released, she was still suspected of her chastity by her own husband Ramawijaya. So, to show that as long as in the reign of the King of Alengka, Sinta has not been stained, Shinta proves herself by plunging into the fire. Shinta was saved from the raging fire by the gods of heaven.

See also

 Amba
 Vivah Panchami
 Sita Sings the Blues
 Siya Ke Ram
 Thabaton

Notes

References

Citations

Sources

External links
 
 
 

Hindu goddesses
Mother goddesses
Solar dynasty
Mithila
Kidnapped people
Lakshmi
Characters in the Ramayana
Consorts of Vishnu
Hindu given names
National heroes of Nepal